Texas's 21st congressional district of the United States House of Representatives serves the area north of San Antonio and a significant portion of Austin in the state of Texas. Towns entirely or partially in this district include Boerne, Fredericksburg, Ingram, Kerrville, Kyle, New Braunfels, and San Marcos. The current Representative from the 21st district is Chip Roy.

Demographics 
According to the APM Research Lab's Voter Profile Tools (featuring the U.S. Census Bureau's 2019 American Community Survey), the district contained about 628,000 potential voters (citizens, age 18+). Of these, 65% are White and 26% are Latino. Immigrants make up 4% of the district's potential voters. Median income among households (with one or more potential voter) in the district is about $75,100, while 9% of households live below the poverty line. As for the educational attainment of potential voters in the district, 44% hold a bachelor's or higher degree.

Election results from statewide races

List of members representing the district

Recent election results

2006
In the case of League of United Latin American Citizens v. Perry, 548 U. S. 399 (2006), the U.S. Supreme Court ruled that the configuration of Texas'  15th, 21st, 23rd, 25th and 28th congressional districts as drawn by the Texas Legislature violated the National Voting Rights Act of 1965.  Replacement district boundaries for the 2006 election were subsequently issued for the five districts by the local federal district court, and on election day in November, these five districts had open primaries, with candidates being elected for receiving over 50 percent of the vote. Runoff elections were held in December to decide elections in which no candidate gained an absolute majority in November.

In the 2006 election, Lamar Smith defeated veteran and college administrator John Courage with 60% of the vote.

2008

2010
In the 2010 election, Lamar Smith defeated Lainey Melnick with 68.9 percent of the vote. Melnick, an Austin real estate broker, officially filed papers with the Federal Election Commission on June 23, 2009 to become a candidate.

2012
Incumbent Lamar Smith faced five challengers in the 2012 general election on November 6, 2012: Candace Duval (Dem), John-Henry Liberty (Lib), Fidel Castillo (Grn), Bill Stout (Grn), and Carlos Pena (Ind).

2014

2016

2018
Lamar Smith did not run for reelection in 2018.

On the Republican side, 18 candidates competed in the March 6 primary, in which no one received a majority. The first- and second-place finishers were, respectively, attorney Chip Roy, who served as chief of staff to Sen. Ted Cruz (R-Tex.) and senior advisor to Texas Gov. Rick Perry (R), and Matt McCall, owner of a business providing human tissue for American military hospitals. Roy and McCall advanced to a May 22 runoff, which Roy won with 52.7% of the vote.

On the Democratic side, four candidates ran to replace Smith: Joseph Kopser, entrepreneur and Army veteran; Derrick Crowe, activist; Elliott McFadden, executive director of Austin B-cycle; and Mary Street Wilson, pastor. No one received a majority in the March 6 primary, so the top two finishers, Wilson and Kopser, advanced to a runoff on May 22. Kopser flipped the primary result in the runoff against Wilson, winning the nomination with 58% of the vote.

2020
The incumbent, Chip Roy, was unopposed for the Republican nomination. Former state Senator Wendy Davis won the Democratic primary runoff. Tom Wakely was nominated by the Green Party caucus. The state Supreme Court insured his inclusion after Wendy Davis tried unsuccessfully to have him removed from the ballot. Perennial candidate Arthur DiBianca is the Libertarian nominee, but Roy joined a last-minute suit to strike his name and other similarly situated Libertarians from the ballot.

Primary results

General election

Historical district boundaries

See also

 List of United States congressional districts
 United States congressional delegations from Texas

References

 Congressional Biographical Directory of the United States 1774–present

21